Ficus callosa is an Asian species of fig tree in the family Moraceae.   
No subspecies are listed in the Catalogue of Life; the native range of this species is India, southern China, Indo-China and Malesia (not New Guinea).  The species can be found in Vietnam: where it may be called đa chai or đa gùa.

Description and Gallery 
F.  callosa is a medium-sized tree, whose leaves, especially when young, are polymorphic and often elongated.  The syconia are pedunculate and 20–25 mm in diameter.

References

External links 
 

callosa
Trees of Vietnam
Flora of Indo-China
Flora of Malesia
Plants described in 1798